"Pop, Lock & Drop It" is the debut single by rapper Huey, released on September 19, 2006, from his debut album Notebook Paper. In early March 2007, "Pop, Lock, & Drop It" debuted on the GOD Is still working  at number 98, then later peaked at number six, becoming his first and only hit.

The song was a success on the 106 & Park countdown. Although it did not peak at number one, it stayed on the countdown for 51+ days. On March 8, 2007, rapper Bow Wow announced that he would be featured on the remix of the single, along with R&B singer T-Pain. The remix began receiving airplay in May of the same year. Another remix features Romeo.

Although "Pop, Lock & Drop It" is a song about a dance move, it is debated whether it refers to the process of firing a handgun. In physics, the 6th, 7th, and 8th derivatives of position are facetiously named pop, lock, and drop respectively. This video was featured on MTV Jams in mid-February 2007.

Background
Huey's older brother referred him to producer Angela Richardson, who was creating a rap group. Huey's songs "Oh" and "Pop, Lock & Drop It" became local favorites among DJs and promoters. He was featured on a series of mixtapes, one of which, Unsigned Hype, sold out of its run of 8,000 copies and was noticed by producer TJ Chapman, who introduced the rapper to Vice President of A&R at Jive Records, Mickey "MeMpHiTz" Wright, in 2006. "Pop, Lock & Drop It", a heavy club track, was further popularised by its signature squatting dance move.

Critical reception
In 2017, Danny Schwartz of HotNewHipHop named the song one the biggest one-hit wonders of 2006, describing it as "a horny, high-octane crunk slapper that begins with a foreboding moment of musical uncertainty before plowing ahead with Huey's raunchy chants an irresistible call to hit the dance floor".

Commercial performance
"Pop, Lock & Drop It" peaked at number six on the Billboard Hot 100 in 2007, charting for 23 weeks. The track climbed to number two on the Billboard Hot Rap Songs chart, where it stayed for over six months (27 weeks).

Formats and track listing
US CD (promo)
"Pop, Lock & Drop It" (main version) – 4:23
"Pop, Lock & Drop It" (instrumental) – 4:17

US CD remix (promo)
"Pop, Lock & Drop It" (remix) (main version) (featuring Bow Wow and T-Pain) – 4:30
"Pop, Lock & Drop It" (remix) (instrumental) – 4:30
"Pop, Lock & Drop It (remix) (acappella) (featuring Bow Wow and T-Pain) – 4:30

US digital download
"Pop, Lock & Drop It" – 4:23

US digital download (remix)
"Pop, Lock & Drop It" (featuring Bow Wow and T-Pain) – 4:30

Charts and certifications

Charts

Certifications

Year-end charts

References

2006 songs
2006 debut singles
2007 singles
Huey (rapper) songs
Hip hop dance
Crunk songs
Jive Records singles